Aqua Blue Sport was an Irish UCI Professional Continental cycling team founded in January 2017 which folded at the end of the 2018 season.

History
The team was set up by businessman Rick Delaney, assuring funding for at least four seasons with two-year rolling contracts offered to the riders. The project was based on a self-sustaining finance model, with revenue generated from an online cycling marketplace www.aquabluesport.com being used to fund the professional team.

Aqua Blue Sport featured a 16-rider roster for 2017. Having gained considerable success in the early months of its maiden season, Aqua Blue Sport was invited to the 2017 Vuelta a España. Despite losing their team bus to an arson attack, the team continued at the Vuelta. On stage 17 of their first Grand Tour, Stefan Denifl crossed the finish line first, ahead of Alberto Contador at the summit finish of Los Machucos, however his win was later striped after he confessed to blood doping. In its first year, the team won its first individual stage, its first national champion, its first overall at a stage race, and its first stage at a Grand Tour (although the latter two were latter striped as a result of Denifl's doping admission).

On August 27, 2018, the team announced that it would not be racing in 2019, citing difficulties in obtaining race invitations from race organizers and a failed merger with the Vérandas Willems–Crelan team. and ceased racing immediately.

Team roster

Major wins
2017
Stage 4 Tour de Suisse, Larry Warbasse
 Road Race Championships, Larry Warbasse
 Overall Tour of Austria, Stefan Denifl
Stage 17 Vuelta a España, Stefan Denifl

2018
Stage 1 Herald Sun Tour, Lasse Norman Hansen
Elfstedenronde, Adam Blythe
 Road Race Championships, Conor Dunne
Stage 1 Danmark Rundt, Lasse Norman Hansen

Supplementary statistics
Sources

National champions
2017
 American Road Race, Larry Warbasse
2018
 Irish Road Race, Conor Dunne

Notes

References

External links

Cycling teams established in 2017
Cycling teams based in Ireland
UCI Professional Continental teams
2017 establishments in Ireland